The  Carcel is a former French unit for measuring the intensity of light. The unit was defined in 1860 as the intensity of a Carcel lamp with standard burner and chimney dimensions, which burnt colza oil
 (obtained from the seed of the plant Brassica campestris)  at a rate of  42 grams of colza oil per hour with a flame 40 millimeters in height.

In modern terminology one carcel equals about 9.74 candelas.

References

See also
Jail,  or cárcel in Spanish

Physical quantities
Units of luminous intensity
Lighting
Obsolete units of measurement